The UNESCO Convention Against Discrimination in Education is a multilateral treaty which aims to combat discrimination in the field of education. It was adopted on 14 December 1960 in Paris and came into effect on 22 May 1962. The Convention also ensures the free choice of religious education and private school, and the right to use or teach their own languages for national minority groups. The Convention prohibits any reservation. As of December 2022, 109 states were members of the Convention.
It is the first international instrument which covers the right to education extensively and has a binding force in international law. It is recognized as a cornerstone of Education 2030 Agenda and represents a powerful tool to advance the Sustainable Development Goals (SDG4).

There is an additional Protocol Instituting a Conciliation and Good Offices Commission, which was adopted on 10 December 1962 and entered into force on 24 October 1968 in signatory States. As of October 2019, the Protocol has 37 members (including Vietnam; post-unification Vietnam has not expressed a position on whether it succeeds pre-unification South Vietnam as a member of the Protocol).

This Convention is also referred to in the Preamble of International Convention on the Elimination of All Forms of Racial Discrimination and UN International Convention on the Protection of the Rights of All Migrant Workers and Members of Their Families.

Contents
Article 1 defines "discrimination" as any distinction, exclusion, limitation or preference on the basis of race, color, sex, language, religion, political or other opinion, origin national or social status, economic status or birth. 

However, the article indicates a number of situations which are not to be considered to constitute discrimination. This includes the creation or maintenance of separate educational systems or establishments for pupils of both sexes, when they have easy access to education:
establishment or maintenance on religious or linguistic grounds, and 
the establishment or maintenance of private educational institutions, if the purpose of such institutions is not to ensure exclusion of any group but to add to the educational opportunities offered by the public authorities. 

Article 3 requires States to eliminate and prevent discrimination and Article 5 affirms respect for the freedom of parents in the choice of private schools, and for national minorities to have the right to engage in educational activities of their own and the employment or teaching of their own language. 

Article 9 prohibits any reservation to the Convention.

See also
Discrimination in education
Freedom of education
Inclusion (education)
Minority language
Right to education
List of international anti-discrimination acts

References

External links
Convention text and Protocol
Commentary on the convention
Comparative analysis of the Convention and Articles 13, 14 ICESCR
UNESCO webpage on the Convention
10th Consultation on the implementation of the Convention and Recommendation against Discrimination in Education consultation

Anti-discrimination treaties
Discrimination
Convention against Discrimination in Education
UNESCO treaties
Treaties concluded in 1960
Treaties entered into force in 1962
Convention against Discrimination in Education
Treaties of Afghanistan
Treaties of the People's Socialist Republic of Albania
Treaties of Algeria
Treaties of Argentina
Treaties of Armenia
Treaties of Australia
Treaties of Barbados
Treaties of the Byelorussian Soviet Socialist Republic
Treaties of Belize
Treaties of the Republic of Dahomey
Treaties of Bolivia
Treaties of Bosnia and Herzegovina
Treaties of the military dictatorship in Brazil
Treaties of Brunei
Treaties of the People's Republic of Bulgaria
Treaties of Burkina Faso
Treaties of the Central African Republic
Treaties of Cape Verde
Treaties of Chile
Treaties extended to Macau
Treaties of the Republic of the Congo
Treaties of Costa Rica
Treaties of Ivory Coast
Treaties of Croatia
Treaties of Cuba
Treaties of Cyprus
Treaties of Czechoslovakia
Treaties of the Czech Republic
Treaties of Denmark
Treaties of Dominica
Treaties of the Dominican Republic
Treaties of Ecuador
Treaties of Egypt
Treaties of Finland
Treaties of France
Treaties of Georgia (country)
Treaties of West Germany
Treaties of East Germany
Treaties of Guatemala
Treaties of Guinea
Treaties of Honduras
Treaties of the Hungarian People's Republic
Treaties of Indonesia
Treaties of Pahlavi Iran
Treaties of Ba'athist Iraq
Treaties of Israel
Treaties of Iceland
Treaties of Italy
Treaties of Jamaica
Treaties of Jordan
Treaties of Kazakhstan
Treaties of Kuwait
Treaties of Kyrgyzstan
Treaties of Latvia
Treaties of Lebanon
Treaties of Liberia
Treaties of the Libyan Arab Republic
Treaties of Luxembourg
Treaties of Madagascar
Treaties of Mali
Treaties of Malta
Treaties of Mauritius
Treaties of the Mongolian People's Republic
Treaties of Montenegro
Treaties of Monaco
Treaties of Morocco
Treaties of the Netherlands
Treaties of New Zealand
Treaties of Nicaragua
Treaties of Niger
Treaties of Nigeria
Treaties of Norway
Treaties of Panama
Treaties of Peru
Treaties of the Philippines
Treaties of the Polish People's Republic
Treaties of Portugal
Treaties of Moldova
Treaties of the Socialist Republic of Romania
Treaties of the Soviet Union
Treaties of Rwanda
Treaties of Saint Vincent and the Grenadines
Treaties of Saudi Arabia
Treaties of San Marino
Treaties of Senegal
Treaties of Serbia and Montenegro
Treaties of Seychelles
Treaties of Sierra Leone
Treaties of Slovakia
Treaties of Slovenia
Treaties of the Solomon Islands
Treaties of South Africa
Treaties of Francoist Spain
Treaties of Sri Lanka
Treaties of Eswatini
Treaties of Sweden
Treaties of Tajikistan
Treaties of North Macedonia
Treaties of Togo
Treaties of Tunisia
Treaties of Turkmenistan
Treaties of Uganda
Treaties of the Ukrainian Soviet Socialist Republic
Treaties of the United Kingdom
Treaties of Tanzania
Treaties of Uruguay
Treaties of Uzbekistan
Treaties of Venezuela
Treaties of Zimbabwe
Treaties of Yugoslavia
1960 in France
Treaties extended to Ashmore and Cartier Islands
Treaties extended to the Australian Antarctic Territory
Treaties extended to Christmas Island
Treaties extended to the Cocos (Keeling) Islands
Treaties extended to Heard Island and McDonald Islands
Treaties extended to Norfolk Island
Treaties extended to the Coral Sea Islands
Treaties extended to the Faroe Islands
Treaties extended to Greenland
Treaties extended to the Netherlands Antilles
Treaties extended to Aruba
Treaties extended to the Cook Islands
Treaties extended to Niue
Treaties extended to Tokelau
Treaties extended to the Cayman Islands
Treaties extended to the Falkland Islands
Treaties extended to Gibraltar
Treaties extended to Montserrat
Treaties extended to Saint Helena, Ascension and Tristan da Cunha
Treaties extended to Anguilla
Treaties extended to the Turks and Caicos Islands
Treaties extended to the British Virgin Islands
Treaties extended to Portuguese Macau
Treaties extended to the Territory of Papua and New Guinea
Treaties extended to the Nauru Trust Territory
Treaties extended to British Antigua and Barbuda
Treaties extended to the Colony of Barbados
Treaties extended to Basutoland
Treaties extended to British Guiana
Treaties extended to British Honduras
Treaties extended to the British Solomon Islands
Treaties extended to British Dominica
Treaties extended to the Gambia Colony and Protectorate
Treaties extended to the Gilbert and Ellice Islands
Treaties extended to the Crown Colony of Malta
Treaties extended to British Mauritius
Treaties extended to Saint Christopher-Nevis-Anguilla
Treaties extended to British Saint Lucia
Treaties extended to British Saint Vincent and the Grenadines
Treaties extended to the Crown Colony of Seychelles
Treaties extended to Swaziland (protectorate)
Treaties extended to the Kingdom of Tonga (1900–1970)
Treaties extended to Bahrain (protectorate)
Treaties extended to West Berlin
Minority languages
Treaties of Andorra
Treaties of the State of Palestine